The 2005 European GP2 round was a GP2 Series motor race held on 28 May and 29 May 2005 at the Nürburgring in Nürburg, Germany. It was the fourth race of the 2005 GP2 Series season. The race was used to support the 2005 European Grand Prix.

The first race was won by Heikki Kovalainen for Arden International, with Giorgio Pantano second for Super Nova Racing and Nico Rosberg finishing third for ART Grand Prix.

The second race was won by Clivio Piccione for Durango, with Adam Carroll for Super Nova Racing and Nelson Ángelo Piquet for Hitech/Piquet Racing also on the podium.

Classification

Qualifying

Race 1

Race 2

Standings after the round 

Drivers' Championship standings

Teams' Championship standings

 Note: Only the top five positions are included for both sets of standings.

References

External links
 gp2.gpupdate.net

Nurburgring Gp2 Round, 2005
Nurburgring
Sport in Rhineland-Palatinate